The 1989 season was the West Coast Eagles' 3rd season in the Victorian Football League (VFL). The Eagles finished 11th out of 14 teams, the poorest performance of the club's three seasons to date.

List

Player changes

Pre-season

Trades

Draft selections

Pre-draft selections
1: Stevan Jackson
2: Don Pyke
3: Peter Sumich
4: Craig Turley
5: Scott Watters

1988 National draft
2: Todd Breman
10: Peter Higgins (re-drafted)
24: David Hynes
38: Jeremy Crough
44: Scott Williamson
52: Darren Bartsch
66: Matt Richardson
80: Damian Berto
94: Andrew Geddes
108: Peter Melesso

1989 pre-season draft
10: Shane Cable
24: Clinton Browning
38: Shane Ellis
52: Richard Geary

Panasonic Cup
The 1989 Panasonic Cup was played in a knock-out format. Matches were played during the months of February and March, before the regular season started. All matches were held at Waverley Park, in Mulgrave, Victoria.

Regular season
Home team's score listed in bold
Best on ground refers to the player who was awarded three votes in the Brownlow Medal

Summary

Ladder

Citations

References

External links
2011 West Coast Eagles Fixtures
West Coast Eagles Official AFL Site
Official Site of the Australian Football League

West Coast Eagles
West Coast Eagles seasons